The Eifelpark is a wildlife and leisure park in Gondorf near Bitburg in the Eifel mountains of Germany.

History 
In 1964 the Eifelpark was first opened under the name, Hochwildpark Eifel ("Eifel Mountain Wildlife Park"), as the first open-air wildlife enclosure in Germany. With the introduction of brown bears in 1969, Berlin took on the sponsorship of the bear gorge. In 1975 the then Minister-President of Rhineland-Palatinate, Helmut Kohl, opened the new mountain wildlife park in the Eifelpark. In the following years other attractions were added (such as the Slide Paradise, roller coaster, Eifel Express, Hüpfkissen, all weather rodelbahn, etc.). Since 2004 the Eifelpark, which had hitherto been run together with the Kurpfalz Park and the Panorama Park, has been managed from Haan (near Düsseldorf).

In early 2009, six Canadian timber wolves were introduced to the enclosure next to the renaturalised bear gorge.

In December 2012 the operator filed for bankruptcy.

Since 16 October 2013 the park has had a new owner and was reopened on 5 April 2014.

In the 2014 season, the family ride, Eifel Blitz, a Big Apple roller coaster, was opened along with various bumper car rides, a merry-go-round and other attractions. In addition everything was thoroughly renovated and the zoo was invested in. In 2015 more rides were added: the Gondorf Pirate Fight (a splash battle) and the Eifel Water Hunt (a jet ski with a crocodile theme by Heege).

Attractions 

80m Spining Drop Tower
14m family free fall tower
 Mountain Wildlife Park (Bergwildpark), (over 200 animals) with bear gorge and lynx station, Canadian timber wolves, wild boar, red deer and fallow deer
 Eifel Express (road train)
 Petting zoo with mountain goats
 Woodland educational path
 Eifel Coaster (all weather rodelbahn), 1,050 m long
 Family roller coaster, 126 m long, 30 km/h top speed
 Adventure playground
 2 bumper car rides
 Water scooters
 Pony Express
 Horse merry-go-round
 Children's merry-go-round
 Bungee trampoline
 trampoline
 Freefall slide with 60% gradient, 40 m long
 Curved pipe slide and wave slide
 Bouncy pillows
 Fliegenpilz (Wellenflug-Kettenkarussell)
 Numerous play parks
 Pedal boats
 Electric cars

Shows 
Different shows are put on in the woodland theatre and the event grounds:
 Birds of prey free flight show with eagles, falcons and owls
 Puppet theatre 
 Daily animal feeding
 dog show

References 

Zoos in Germany
Amusement parks in Germany
Eifel
Culture of Rhineland-Palatinate
Wildlife parks